Deerwood is an unincorporated community and census-designated place (CDP) in Montgomery County, Texas, United States. It was first listed as a CDP prior to the 2020 census.

It is within the southwest corner of Sam Houston National Forest, and it is bordered to the south by Conroe Division of the BNSF Railway.

References 

Populated places in Montgomery County, Texas
Census-designated places in Montgomery County, Texas
Census-designated places in Texas